This is a list of the endemic fauna of Puerto Rico. This list is sorted in alphabetical order by the scientific name of the species.

Birds

Yellow-shouldered blackbird (Agelaius xanthomus)
Puerto Rican parrot (Amazona vittata)
Green mango (Anthracothorax viridis)
Puerto Rican nightjar (Caprimulgus noctitherus)
Puerto Rican emerald (Chlorostilbon maugeaus)
Puerto Rican lizard‑cuckoo (Coccyzus vieilloti)
Puerto Rican pewee (Contopus portoricenis)
Adelaide's warbler (Dendroica adelaidae)
Elfin-woods warbler (Dendroica angelae)
Puerto Rican oriole (Icterus portoricensis)
Puerto Rican bullfinch (Loxigilla portoricensis)
Puerto Rican owl (Gymnasio nudipes)
Puerto Rican woodpecker (Melanerpes portoricensis)
Puerto Rican flycatcher (Myiarchus antillarum)
Puerto Rican tanager (Nesospingus speculiferus)
Puerto Rican spindalis (Spindalis portoricensis)
Puerto Rican tody (Todus mexicanus)
Puerto Rican vireo (Vireo latimeri)

Crustaceans
Buruquena (Epilobocera sinuatifrons)
Puerto Rican sand crab (Emerita portoricensis)

Insects
Camponotus kaura- was first described by Roy R. Snelling & Juan A. Torres
Solenopsis torrei- was first described by Juan A. Torres

Myriapoda
Cylindromus uniporus
Scolopendra alternans

Reptiles/amphibians 

Puerto Rican racer (Borikenophis portoricensis)
Mona ameiva (Ameiva alboguttata)
Desecheo ameiva (Ameiva desechensis)
Puerto Rican ground lizard (Ameiva exsul)
Blue-tailed ground lizard (Ameiva wetmorei)
Baker's worm lizard (Amphisbaena bakeri)
Puerto Rican worm lizard (Amphisbaena caeca)
Schmidt's worm lizard (Amphisbaena schmiditi)
Puerto Rican dryland worm lizard, North American worm lizard (Amphisbaena xera)
Guánica pallid anole, Cook's pallid anole, Cook's anole (Anolis cooki)
Mona anole (Anolis monensis)
Dwarf anole, pygmy anole, Puerto Rican twig anole (Anolis occultus)
Ponce anole (Anolis poncensis), which is the same as the Dryland grass anole (Ctenonotus poncensis)
Puerto Rican garden snake (Magliophis exiguus subspadix)
Puerto Rican crested toad, ridge-headed toad, lowland Caribbean toad, Puerto Rican toad and sapo concho (Bufo lemur)
Mona ground iguana (Cyclura cornuta stejnegeri)
Puerto Rican galliwasp (Diploglossus pleei)
Puerto Rican cave dwelling frog (Eleutherodactylus cooki)
Common coquí (Eleutherodactylus coqui)
Mottled coquí (Eleutherodactylus eneidae)
Golden coquí (Eleutherodactylus jasperi)
Mona coquí (Eleutherodactylus monensis)
Puerto Rican boa (Chilabothrus inornatus)
Mona Island boa (Chilabothrus monensis)
Monito gecko (Sphaerodactylus micropithecus)
Mona dwarf gecko (Sphaerodactylus monensis)
Puerto Rico upland gecko (Sphaerodactylus klauberi)
Desecheo dwarf gecko (Sphaerodactylus levinsi)
Gaige's least gecko (Sphaerodactylus gaigeae)
Townsend's dwarf gecko (Sphaerodactylus townsendi)
Nichols' dwarf gecko (Sphaerodactylus nicholsi)
Puerto Rican dwarf gecko (Sphaerodactylus grandisquamis)
Isla Vieques dwarf gecko (Sphaerodactylus inigoi)
Roosevelt's dwarf gecko (Sphaerodactylus roosevelti)
Mona blindsnake (Typhlops monensis)
Puerto Rican wetland blind snake (Typhlops rostellatus)

Spiders
This is a list of all spiders endemic to Puerto Rico, according to Platnick.
 Anyphaenidae
 Anyphaena decora
 Wulfila coamoanus
 Wulfila inconspicuus
 Wulfila isolatus
 Wulfila macropalpus
 Wulfila tropicus
 Araneidae
 Araneus adjuntaensis
 Lewisepeira maricao
 Metazygia silvestris
 Clubionidae
 Clubiona desecheonis
 Elaver portoricensis
 Corinnidae
 Abapeba guanicae
 Abapeba wheeleri
 Corinna javuyae
 Phrurolithus insularis
 Phrurolithus portoricensis
 Trachelas borinquensis
 Ctenidae
 Celaetycheus modestus
 Celaetycheus strenuus
 Oligoctenus ottleyi
 Trujillina isolata
 Dipluridae
 Masteria petrunkevitchi
 Gnaphosidae
 Camillina desecheonis
 Neozimiris nuda
 Hahniidae
 Hahnia naguaboi
Ixodidae (ticks)
 Amblyomma arianae
 Linyphiidae
 Lepthyphantes microserratus
 Lycosidae
 Agalenocosa yaucensis
 Mimetidae
 Mimetus portoricensis
 Oonopidae
 Oonops delegenus
 Oonops ebenecus
 Oonops viridans
 Stenoonops econotus
 Stenoonops phonetus
 Stenoonops portoricensis
 Pholcidae
 Modisimus cavaticus
 Modisimus coeruleolineatus
 Modisimus montanus
 Modisimus montanus dentatus
 Modisimus sexoculatus
 Modisimus signatus
 Salticidae
 Agobardus blandus
 Corythalia gloriae
 Corythalia tristriata
 Emathis luteopunctata
 Emathis minuta
 Emathis portoricensis
 Emathis tetuani
 Eris illustris
 Habronattus ensenadae
 Habronattus facetus
 Hentzia squamata
 Jollas minutus
 Neonella mayaguez
 Sidusa mona
 Siloca monae
 Scytodidae
 Scytodes dissimulans
 Sparassidae
 Olios bicolor
 Olios darlingtoni
 Pseudosparianthis jayuyae
 Stasina portoricensis
 Tetragnathidae
 Chrysometa hamata
 Chrysometa jayuyensis
 Chrysometa yunque
 Glenognatha gloriae
 Tetragnatha bryantae
 Theraphosidae
 Avicularia laeta
 Cyrtopholis culebrae
 Cyrtopholis portoricae
 Holothele culebrae
 Theridiidae
 Dipoena puertoricensis
 Styposis lutea
 Theridion ricense
 Theridiosomatidae
 Baalzebub albonotatus
 Ogulnius gloriae
 Thomisidae
 Misumenops bubulcus
 Rejanellus mutchleri
 Tmarus vertumus
 Uloboridae
 Miagrammopes animotus

Extinct animals
Greater Puerto Rican ground sloth (Acratocnus major) - The greater Puerto Rican ground sloth became extinct approximately 3000–4000 years ago.
Lesser Puerto Rican ground sloth (Acratocnus odontrigonus) - The lesser Puerto Rican ground sloth became extinct approximately 3000–4000 years ago.
Puerto Rican caracara (Caracara latebrosus)
Puerto Rican plate-tooth (Elasmodontomys obliquus) - The Puerto Rican plate-tooth, giant hutia or Puerto Rican paca became extinct approximately in the early 16th century.
Greater Puerto Rican agouti (Heteropsomys antillensis)
Lesser Puerto Rican agouti (Heteropsomys insulans)
Puerto Rican nesophontes (Nesophontes edithae) - The Puerto Rican nesophontes became extinct approximately in the early 16th century.
Corozal rat (Puertoricomys corozalus)
Puerto Rican parakeet, Mauge's parakeet (Psittacara chloroptera maugei syn. Psittacara maugei)
Puerto Rican barn owl (Tyto cavatica)

See also

 List of amphibians and reptiles of Puerto Rico
 List of endemic flora of Puerto Rico
 List of Puerto Rican birds
 San Juan Botanical Garden

Footnotes

References
Sociedad Ornitológica Puertorriqueña 
Bosque Seco de Guánica 
Integrated Taxonomic Information System
Extinct vertebrates of the U.S.A., U.S. territories and Canada since 1492

 List
 Puerto Rico
Endemic fauna